Francisco Antonio de Monteser (c. 1620–1668) was a dramatist of the Spanish Golden Age. He was born in Seville and died in Madrid.

1620s births
1668 deaths
Spanish dramatists and playwrights
Spanish male dramatists and playwrights